Michigan's 17th congressional district is an obsolete United States congressional district in Michigan. The first Representative to Congress elected from the 17th district, George Anthony Dondero, took office in 1933, after reapportionment due to the 1930 census. The district was dissolved following the 1990 census. The last Representative elected from the district, Sander M. Levin, was subsequently elected from the 12th district.

From 1982 until the districts demise it included all of Detroit west of the Southfield Freeway, Redford Township, Dearborn Heights, Southfield, Lathrup Village, Oak Park, Berkley, Royal Oak Township, Pleasant Ridge, Ferndale, Royal Oak, Huntington Woods and Clawson.

List of representatives

References

 The Political graveyard: U.S. Representatives from Michigan, 1807-2003
 U.S. Representatives 1837-2003, Michigan Manual 2003-2004

 Congressional Biographical Directory of the United States 1774–present

17
Former congressional districts of the United States
Constituencies established in 1933
1933 establishments in Michigan
Constituencies disestablished in 1993
1993 disestablishments in Michigan